Maxakalisaurus is a genus of titanosaur dinosaur, found in the Adamantina Formation of Brazil, in the state of Minas Gerais in 1998. The genus name is derived from the tribe of the Maxakali; Topa is one of their divinities.

Description 
It had a long neck and tail, ridged teeth (unusual among sauropods) and lived about 80 million years ago. Because sauropods seem to have lacked significant competition in South America, they evolved there with greater diversity and more unusual traits than elsewhere in the world. Like the fellow titanosaur Saltasaurus, Maxakalisaurus had defensive osteoderms; one has been found on the holotype.

In 2016, a new specimen comprising a dentary and teeth was described as belonging to Maxakalisaurus. 

A reconstructed Maxakalisaurus skeleton was on display in the National Museum of Brazil. It is currently unknown if it was damaged by the National Museum of Brazil fire on 2 September 2018.

Classification
França et al.'s 2016 description of the second specimen also included a phylogenetic analysis, which placed Maxakalisaurus as a basal member of the Aeolosaurini. Their cladogram is shown below:

References

 Santucci, R. M. & Bertini, R.J. (2006). "A large sauropod titanosaur from Peirópolis, Bauru Group, Brazil." N. Jb. Geol. Paläont. Mh., 2006: 344-360; Stuttgart.

External links
Brazil's Biggest Dinosaur Unveiled - LiveScience.com

Lithostrotians
Late Cretaceous dinosaurs of South America
Cretaceous Brazil
Fossils of Brazil
Adamantina Formation
Fossil taxa described in 2006
Taxa named by Alexander Kellner